The following is the list of episodes for the Japanese anime series Kyōran Kazoku Nikki. The episodes are produced by Nomad and are directed by Yasuhiro Kuroda. The series is composed by Mamiko Ikeda and anime characters designed by Makoto Koga in reference to the characters from the light novel series designed by x6suke. The anime started its run on TV Kanagawa on April 12, 2008 and subsequently aired on other stations such as Chiba TV, Tokai TV, TV Osaka, TV Saitama, TV Shinhiroshima and TVQ Kyushu Broadcasting Co., Ltd. Nine different pieces of theme music are used—one opening theme and eight ending themes. The eight different ending themes are sung by each of the eight main characters. The order of the ending themes and their associated animation sequence differs for each TV station.

List of episodes

References

External links
Official Anime Site 

Kyoran Kazoku Nikki